The Firefly of France is a lost 1918 American silent drama film directed by Donald Crisp and written by Margaret Turnbull based upon a novelette by Marion Polk Angelotti. The film stars Wallace Reid, Ann Little, Charles Ogle, Raymond Hatton, Winter Hall, and Ernest Joy. The film was released on July 7, 1918, by Paramount Pictures.

Plot
As described in a film magazine, while the actions of Esme Falconer (Little) are suspicious, Devereux Bayne's (Reid) admiration for her forces him to believe in her. When her chauffeur is mysteriously killed, he drives her to a deserted chateau to protect her from French officers. But the officers get there first, and upon their arrival Devereux and Esme are made prisoners. Escaping through a secret door they come upon Jean, known as the Firefly (Hatton), who has important papers for France. The French officers turn out to be German officers in disguise and they demand the papers. Devereux gives them a false copy of the papers and manages to turn them over to the proper authorities. He wins the heart of Esme and a French Cross of Honor for his bravery.

Cast
Wallace Reid as Devereux Bayne
Ann Little as Esme Falconer
Charles Ogle as Von Blenheim
Raymond Hatton as The Firefly
Winter Hall as Dunham
Ernest Joy as Aide to Von Blenheim
William Elmer as Aide to Von Blenheim
Clarence Geldart as Aide to Von Blenheim
Henry Woodward as Georges
Jane Wolfe as Marie-Jeanne
Noah Beery role unknown, (*he's in surviving still in naval uniform)

See also
Wallace Reid filmography

References

External links 
 
 
Angellotti, Marion Polk (1918), The Firefly of France, New York: The Century Company, on the Internet Archive

1918 films
1910s English-language films
Silent American drama films
1918 drama films
Paramount Pictures films
Films directed by Donald Crisp
American black-and-white films
American silent feature films
Lost American films
1918 lost films
Lost drama films
1910s American films